Malaysia competed at the 2016 Summer Olympics in Rio de Janeiro, Brazil, from 5 to 21 August 2016. This was the nation's fifteenth appearance at the Olympics, although it had previously competed in two other editions under the name Malaya. Tan Sri Mohamed Al-Amin Abdul Majid was the chef de mission of the national delegation at the Games.

The Olympic Council of Malaysia fielded a team of 32 athletes, 17 men and 15 women, across ten sports at the Games, matching its largest team ever from Beijing eight years earlier. Among the sports represented by the nation's athletes, Malaysia made its Olympic debut in golf (new to the 2016 Games), as well as its return to weightlifting after an eight-year absence. Badminton had the largest team by sport with eight athletes, a quarter of the nation's full roster.

The Malaysian team featured two Olympic medalists from London, including platform diver Pandelela Rinong, who became the first female from her country to stand on the podium, and badminton superstar Lee Chong Wei, who sought redemption for the nation's first ever gold after losing two previous finals to China's Lin Dan in the men's singles. Appearing in his fourth Olympics as the most experienced athlete, Lee was selected to lead his contingent as the flag bearer in the opening ceremony. Apart from the medalists, eleven Malaysian athletes previously competed in London, including track cyclist Azizulhasni Awang, and badminton tandem Chan Peng Soon and Goh Liu Ying.

Malaysia left Rio de Janeiro with a total of five medals (four silver and one bronze), signifying its most successful outcome in Olympic history and doubling the previous highest medal tallies set at Atlanta 1996 and London 2012. Among the nation's medalists were Awang, who became the first track cyclist from Southeast Asia to stand on the Olympic podium, and Pandelela, who upgraded her individual bronze from London to share a silver with her partner Cheong Jun Hoong in the synchronised platform diving. Badminton superstar Lee managed to claim a silver for the third consecutive time in the men's singles, adding it to those won by Goh V Shem and Tan Wee Kiong in the men's doubles, and Chan and Goh in the mixed doubles.

Medalists

| width=78% align=left valign=top |

| width=22% align=left valign=top |

Archery
 
Three Malaysian archers qualified for the men's events by virtue of the nation's podium finish in the team recurve competition at the 2016 Archery World Cup meet in Antalya, Turkey.

Athletics
  
Malaysian athletes have achieved qualifying standards in the following event (up to a maximum of 3 athletes in each event):

Track & road events

Field events

Badminton

Malaysia has qualified a total of eight badminton players for each of the following events into the Olympic tournament based on the BWF World Rankings as of 5 May 2016: one entry each in the men's and women's singles, as well as the pair each in the men's, women's, and mixed doubles.

Men

Women

Mixed

Cycling

Track
Following the completion of the 2016 UCI Track Cycling World Championships, Malaysia has entered two riders to compete only in the men's keirin and women's sprint, respectively, at the Olympics, by virtue of their final individual UCI Olympic rankings in those events.

Sprint

Keirin

Diving
 
Malaysian divers qualified for the following individual spots and synchronised teams at the Olympics through the 2015 FINA World Championships and the 2016 FINA World Cup series. Two more divers have been selected through the 2015 Asian Diving Cup. The Malaysian team was announced on 29 June 2016.

Men

Women

Golf

Malaysia has entered four golfers (two per gender) into the Olympic tournament. Danny Chia (world no. 230), Dhia Nur Hilmi Rosman (world no. 321), Kelly Tan (world no. 153) and Michelle Koh (world no. 443) qualified directly among the top 60 eligible players for their respective individual events based on the IGF World Rankings as of 11 July 2016.

Sailing
 
Malaysian sailors have qualified one boat in each of the following classes through the individual fleet World Championships, and the Asian Sailing Championships.

M = Medal race; EL = Eliminated – did not advance into the medal race

Shooting
 
Malaysia has qualified one shooter in the men's pistol events by virtue of his best finish at the 2015 ISSF World Cup series and Asian Championships, as long as he obtained a minimum qualifying score (MQS) by 31 March 2016.

Qualification Legend: Q = Qualify for the next round; q = Qualify for the bronze medal (shotgun)

Swimming
 
Malaysian swimmers have so far achieved qualifying standards in the following events (up to a maximum of 2 swimmers in each event at the Olympic Qualifying Time (OQT), and potentially 1 at the Olympic Selection Time (OST)):

Weightlifting

Malaysia has qualified one male weightlifter for the Rio Olympics by virtue of a top seven national finish at the 2016 Asian Championships, signifying the nation's Olympic return to the sport after an eight-year hiatus. The team must allocate this place by 20 June 2016.

See also
Malaysia at the 2016 Summer Paralympics

References

External links 

 

Olympics
2016
Nations at the 2016 Summer Olympics